Ectobius is a genus of non-cosmopolitan cockroaches once thought native to the Old World and described by Stephens in 1835, belonging to the family Ectobiidae, subfamily Ectobiinae.  The discovery of 4 ectobius cockroaches in Colorado dating to 49 Million years ago suggests the genus actually originated in North America. This genus has been subject to a number of revisions.

Description
 
The adult 'cockroaches' reach  of length, the basic coloration of their body is mostly brown or yellowish, with a clearer margin.

The females are usually bigger than the males and have shorter wings, while in the males wings cover at least the whole abdomen.

Distribution
Species of this genus are mainly present in most of Europe, Africa, in eastern Palearctic realm and the Near East.  The "lesser cockroach" (i.e. as found in Britain), previously placed here, is now in the genus Capraiellus.

The genus was long absent from the North American continent until recent re-introductions of some cool-adapted species in the Canadian Maritimes and North Eastern, US.

Species 

 

The Cockroach Species File lists:

 Ectobius hipposiderus Bohn, 2013
subgenus Ectobiola Uvarov, 1940 (synonym Ectobiella Adelung, 1917)
 Ectobius duskei Adelung, 1906
subgenus Ectobius Stephens, 1835
 Ectobius aeoliensis Failla & Messina, 1974
 Ectobius aethiopicus (Shelford, 1910)
 Ectobius aetnaeus Ramme, 1927
 Ectobius africanus Saussure, 1899
 Ectobius albicinctus (Brunner von Wattenwyl, 1861)
 Ectobius alleni Rehn, 1931
 Ectobius baccettii Failla & Messina, 1979
 Ectobius balcani Ramme, 1923
 Ectobius brunneri Seoane, 1879
 Ectobius burri Adelung, 1917
 Ectobius corsorum Ramme, 1923
 Ectobius darbandae Rehn, 1931
 Ectobius delicatulus Bey-Bienko, 1950
 Ectobius eckerleini Harz, 1977
 Ectobius erythronotus Burr, 1898
 Ectobius filicensis Failla & Messina, 1974
 Ectobius frieseanus Princis, 1963
 Ectobius heteropterus Bey-Bienko, 1963
 Ectobius ichnusae Failla & Messina, 1982
 Ectobius indicus Bey-Bienko, 1938
 Ectobius intermedius Failla & Messina, 1981
 Ectobius involutus Rehn, 1931
 Ectobius jarringi (Hanitsch, 1937)
 Ectobius kervillei Bolívar, 1907
 Ectobius kikensis Rehn, 1931
 Ectobius kikuyuensis Rehn, 1931
 Ectobius kirgizius Bey-Bienko, 1936
 Ectobius kraussianus Ramme, 1923
 Ectobius lagrecai Failla & Messina, 1981
 Ectobius lapponicus (Linnaeus, 1758) - type species  (as Blatta lapponica L. = Ectobius lapponicus lapponicus)
 Ectobius larus Rehn, 1931
 Ectobius leptus Rehn, 1931
 Ectobius lineolatus (Rehn, 1922)
 Ectobius lodosi Harz, 1983
 Ectobius lucidus (Hagenbach, 1822)
 Ectobius makalaka Rehn, 1931
 Ectobius minutus Failla & Messina, 1978
 Ectobius montanus Costa, 1866
 Ectobius neavei Shelford, 1911
 Ectobius nuba Rehn, 1931
 Ectobius pallidus (Olivier, 1789)
 Ectobius palpalis Chopard, 1958
 Ectobius parvosacculatus Failla & Messina, 1974
 Ectobius pavlovskii Bey-Bienko, 1936
 Ectobius punctatissimus Ramme, 1922
 Ectobius pusillus Bey-Bienko, 1967
 Ectobius pyrenaicus Bohn, 1989
 Ectobius rammei Rehn, 1926
 Ectobius sardous Baccetti, 1991
 Ectobius scabriculus Failla & Messina, 1976
 Ectobius semenovi Bey-Bienko, 1935
 Ectobius siculus Ramme, 1949
 Ectobius sjoestedti (Shelford, 1910)
 Ectobius stanleyanus Rehn, 1931
 Ectobius subvitreus Bey-Bienko, 1936
 Ectobius supramontes Bohn, 2004
 Ectobius sylvestris (Poda, 1761)
 Ectobius tadzhikus Bey-Bienko, 1935
 Ectobius textilis Rehn, 1931
 Ectobius ticinus Bohn, 2004
 Ectobius togoensis Ramme, 1923
 Ectobius tuscus Galvagni, 1978
 Ectobius tyrrhenicus Failla & Messina, 1973
 Ectobius usticaensis Failla & Messina, 1974
 Ectobius vittiventris (Costa, 1847)
 Ectobius willemsei Failla & Messina, 1980

References

External links
 Biolib

Cockroach genera